Kazi Nuruzzaman Bir Uttom (24 March 1925 – 6 May 2011) was a Bangladeshi war hero and secular nationalist, who served as one of the principal commanders of the Mukti Bahini during the Bangladesh Liberation War. He also rejected Bir Uttam Award as a tribute to all the unknown, unrecognized martyrs of the war.

Early life
Nuruzzaman was born on 24 March 1925. He received his education from the exclusive St. Xavier's College, Calcutta majoring in chemistry.

Career 
He joined the British Indian Navy in 1943 but due to Jawaharlal Nehru's persuasion, he transferred to the army in 1946 and completed his training from Royal School of Artillery in UK. After partition of India in 1947 he joined Pakistan army & was promoted to Major in 1954. Before retiring from the armed forces he served at East Pakistan Industrial Development Corporation.

Since he was a Bengali in the Pakistan Army, he was subject to racial discrimination. He did not sacrifice his dignity, and one such example was his comment against Ayub Khan.

In October 1958 after General Ayub Khan declared Martial Law in Pakistan, he & Major Salauddin Amin were the only two officers who refused to sign a document of allegiance pledging loyalty to then President of Pakistan, General Ayub Khan.

Bangladesh Liberation War

In 1971, he joined the Liberation War. He was senior to all the sector commanders & was given staff position by C-in-C Osmani.

During the war, Bangladesh was divided into eleven sectors and each of those sectors had a Sector Commander who would direct the guerrilla warfare. He succeeded Major Najmul Haque as Commander of Sector 7 who died in a road crash on September 27, 1971, in India. He played a key role in Bangladesh's achieving independence from Pakistan during the 1971 war.

Post war he was tasked with gathering injured freedom fighters from Kolkata.

Award 
He was awarded the Bir Uttom award, which is the second-highest award for individual gallantry in Bangladesh. As thousands of Mukti Bahini volunteers, mostly farmers, were killed and did not receive any recognition, he chose not to accept any gallantry award. He rejected the Bir Uttom award.

Death 
Nuruzzaman died of old age at Square Hospital on 6 May 2011. He was buried at National Freedom Fighters’ Graveyard at Dhaka Cantonment.

References 

1925 births
2011 deaths
Bangladeshi lieutenant colonels
People from Jessore District
University of Calcutta alumni
Mukti Bahini personnel
Recipients of the Bir Uttom